Grayingham is a village and civil parish in the West Lindsey district of Lincolnshire, England.

The name Grayingham derives from the Old English Gra(ga)+inga+ham for "homestead of the family of a man named Graeg". The name is listed in the 1086 Domesday Book as "Graingeham".

Grayingham Grade II* listed Anglican church is dedicated to Saint Radegund. Originating from the 13th and 14th century, it was rebuilt in 1773 or 1797 leaving the Early English tower and west doorway intact. A further restoration was carried-out in 1870 by James Fowler. The 19th century reredos is by A. B. Skipwith, and a copper-gilt relief of the crucifixion by Conrad Dressler.

Notable people
The English ecologist Adrian Woodruffe-Peacock was Rector of Grayingham towards the end of his life. He died in this post in 1922.

References

External links

"Grayingham", Genuki.org.uk. Retrieved 14 August 2011

Villages in Lincolnshire
Civil parishes in Lincolnshire
West Lindsey District
Grade II* listed buildings in Lincolnshire